Milan Hnilička (born June 25, 1973) is a Czech former ice hockey goalie who played in the National Hockey League for the New York Rangers, Atlanta Thrashers and the Los Angeles Kings and politician. He was a member of the Chamber of Deputies since 2017, but resigned in January 2021 after attending a party in breach of coronavirus restrictions. He was drafted 70th overall by the New York Islanders in the 1991 NHL Entry Draft. In 2000, Milan won the Calder Cup while playing for the Hartford Wolf Pack. He last played in the Czech Extraliga for Bílí Tygři Liberec. He announced his retirement in August 2010. Internationally Hnilička represented the Czechoslovakian national junior team and the Czech national senior team at multiple tournaments, including the 2006 Winter Olympics, where he won a bronze medal.

Playing career
Hnilička played for Poldi SONP Kladno in the Czechoslovak Extraliga for several years. At the 1991 NHL Entry Draft he was selected 70th overall by the New York Islanders, and moved to North America in 1992, spending one season in major junior with the Swift Current Broncos of the Western Hockey League, helping them reach the 1993 Memorial Cup. He then spent 2 seasons in the minor leagues before returning to the Czech Extraliga, where he played a further 4 seasons. Signed by the New York Rangers of the National Hockey League in 1999, he made his NHL debut on October 14, 1999 against the Pittsburgh Penguins. He played 2 games for the Rangers, spending the majority of the season with their American Hockey League affiliate the Hartford Wolf Pack, winning the Calder Cup with them as AHL champions.

Signing as a free agent with the Atlanta Thrashers, he would spend 3 seasons with them, before being traded to the Los Angeles Kings in 2003. Hnilička mainly played for the Kings' AHL affiliate, the Manchester Monarchs, appearing in 2 games for the Kings. He returned to the Czech Republic in 2004 and played 5 seasons with Bílí Tygři Liberec, as well as briefly playing for Salavat Yulaev Ufa of the Russian Superleague in 2007–08. Hnilička's last games were in 2009–10 when he played 3 games for Slavia Praha. He holds the Atlanta Thrashers/Winnipeg Jets franchise record for saves in one game with 53 on December 18, 2001 against the Boston Bruins.

International play 
Hnilička played his first game for the Czechoslovak junior team in 1990 at the 1990 European Junior Championships, winning a bronze medal. He played again for the Czechoslovakian junior team at the 1991 World Junior Championships, again winning bronze. He was named to the Czechoslovakian senior team for both the 1991 Canada Cup and 1991 World Championships, but did not play in either tournament. Hnilička's final tournament for Czechoslovakia was the 1992 World Junior Championships, where the team finished fifth.

With the dissolution of Czechoslovakia he began to represent the Czech national team, playing in 7 World Championships and the 1998 and 2006 Winter Olympics (though he did not play in 1998). He won gold at the 1999, 2001, and 2005 World Championships, as well as a silver in 2006 and bronze in both 1997 and 1998.

Career statistics

Regular season and playoffs

International

References

External links 

1973 births
Living people
People from Litoměřice
ANO 2011 MPs
Atlanta Thrashers players
Chicago Wolves players
Czech ice hockey goaltenders
Denver Grizzlies players
Czech expatriate ice hockey players in Russia
Hartford Wolf Pack players
HC Bílí Tygři Liberec players
Rytíři Kladno players
HC Slavia Praha players
HC Sparta Praha players
Ice hockey players at the 1998 Winter Olympics
Ice hockey players at the 2006 Winter Olympics
Los Angeles Kings players
Manchester Monarchs (AHL) players
Medalists at the 1998 Winter Olympics
Medalists at the 2006 Winter Olympics
Members of the Chamber of Deputies of the Czech Republic (2017–2021)
New York Islanders draft picks
New York Rangers players
Olympic bronze medalists for the Czech Republic
Olympic gold medalists for the Czech Republic
Olympic ice hockey players of the Czech Republic
Olympic medalists in ice hockey
Richmond Renegades players
Salavat Yulaev Ufa players
Salt Lake Golden Eagles (IHL) players
Swift Current Broncos players
Czech expatriate ice hockey players in Canada
Czech expatriate ice hockey players in the United States